Nexus is a Toronto-based percussion ensemble that performs standard percussion ensemble repertoire, ragtime music, world music, contemporary classical music and as a group, has performed as soloist with some of the top orchestras around the world.

The ensemble was originally made up of percussionists Bob Becker, Bill Cahn, Robin Engelman, Russell Hartenberger, John Wyre and Michael Craden. Founding member Michael Craden died of liver cancer in 1982. John Wyre died in 2006 and was replaced by long-time professional colleague Garry Kvistad. Robin Engelman resigned from the group in December 2009 due to vision difficulties and died on February 26, 2016.

The group formed in 1971 and debuted with a concert of entirely improvised music. In the mid-1970s the group recorded two albums with New Age music pioneer Paul Horn: Paul Horn and Nexus (1975) and Altura Do Sol (1976).

Nexus played on the soundtrack of the 1974 film The Man Who Skied Down Everest, and appeared in the 1975 National Film Board movie Musicanada.

In 1982 the group released Nexus and Earle Birney, a triple-album collaboration with noted Canadian poet Earle Birney.

The group recorded an album for the Canadian Broadcasting Corporation, Dance of the Octopus, in 1990 with harpist Judy Loman.

In 1990, Japanese composer Toru Takemitsu wrote a concerto for percussion ensemble and orchestra entitled From me flows what you call Time for the group. Dozens of other composers have written music specifically for Nexus and for individual members of Nexus, and the group's members are also composers and arrangers, writing for Nexus and, on occasion, for others.

In addition to their regular concerts, the group also gives masterclasses and educational performances.

Russell Hartenberger is a professor emeritus at the University of Toronto's Faculty of Music (Dean, Chair of Graduate Education, and Professor, Percussion). Robin Engelman was also a long-time staff member at the University of Toronto, where he mainly taught and conducted the percussion ensemble and the contemporary music ensemble.

Discography

Solo albums 
 John Wyre: Vagabond Dream (Heron, 1991)
 Bob Becker: There is a Time (Nexus, 1994)
 William Cahn: Solo Percussionist Music (Nexus, 1996)

References

External links
 Official website
 Nexus in The Canadian Encyclopedia
 Second article at The Canadian Encyclopedia
 
 Robin Engelman's blog

Percussion ensembles
Contemporary classical music ensembles
Musical groups established in 1971